Mero Euta Saathi Chha (Nepali: मेरो एउटा साथी छ) (English: I Have One Special Friend) is a Nepali movie released on September 11, 2009. This movie was a hit in 2009, and is an unofficial remake of the Korean hit A Millionaire's First Love. The film was a box office success.

Plot 
Story plot begins from the remembrance of childhood friend Jay (Aryan Sigdel) of Shikha (Namrata Shrestha). Shikha is the daughter of the principal (Keshab Bhattarai) of a high school. The high school building is situated in property of Jay's family. Lawyer Bikram Thapa (Ashok Sharma) warns the principal to pay the rent or else, leave the property where a resort will be established. Shikha moves to Jay's town to seek help from him.

Jay, who is the heir to the property, is raised by his grandparents after the death of his parents. Being the rich guy, he abuses his wealth. One day he skips class and while riding on his bike, he gets challenged from another bike rider in black helmet. He gets ahead of him and blocks his way. He acknowledges that the black helmet person was chased by Nepal Police for crime of robbery.

Shikha meets Jay incidentally and nearly meets an accident. They quarrels and he gets away. Later on, Shikha goes to Jay's Hotel but Jay refuses to meet her. Shikha returns to her home then. Jay gets expelled from the college due to his habits. Lawyer reminds him he could only get the property in his name only after he graduates from high school within the next year. Otherwise, 99% of the property will be donated to charity under ownership of lawyer and only 1% in his name.

To finish his high school, he goes to the village where he spent his childhood. He joins the high school there and meets Shikha, who is the monitor of the class as well the instructor of the charity play for collection of funds for the rent to save the high school grounds. Jay getting sick of the village life tries to get away from there. But slowly he starts to like the culture and lifestyle of the village. Later he falls in love with Shikha and starts to help to collect the funds without knowing that the property is his own.

One day new person appears in college named Ragav (Jiwan Luitel) who was the rider in black helmet on the day of robbery. He robbed the bank to pay off the loans of college but was caught due to Jay. He hurts Jay but soon he realizes his mistake. Shikha being a heart patient, starts get heart pains. During the charity play Shikha goes to sleep forever in Jay's arm.

Lawyer tells he want Jay to be good person, so he had sent him to the village. Jay builds foster home for the children and rest of his life he gives up in memory of childhood friend and his love Shikha.

Cast
 Aaryan Sigdel as Jay Shumsher JBR
 Namrata Shrestha as Shikha
 Jiwan Luitel as Ragav
 Ashok Sharma as Lawyer Bikram Thapa
 Keshab Bhattarai as Shikha's father
 Zenisha Moktan
 Sushma Karki
 Dayahang Rai as funny college student
 Bikash Nirola as a fan
 Rekha Thapa in a cameo appearance

Release
The film was released on September 11, 2009. After a year of production, the movie did not follow the queue system. With that provision, it did not get the screening dates at the Bishwa Jyoti Cinema and Ganga Hall but was screened at other cinema halls of both Kathmandu and outside.

Critical response
Although, the film met with some criticism for the story resembling to the Korean movie A Millionaire's First Love, it received positive reviews for its direction, cinematography, choreography and mostly for Aryan Sigdel's performance.

Aryan Sigdel won the National Film Award for the Best Actor in Leading Role for his performance. Sound designer and mixer Uttam Neupane won the National Award for his work in this film.

Box office

Mero Euta Saathi Chha collected approximately 2.15 Crore all around Nepal and overseas.

Music

Tracks
The official track listing.

See also
 A Millionaire's First Love

References

External links
 
 http://www.cybersansar.com/article.php?aid=3234

2009 films
Nepalese romantic comedy films
2000s Nepali-language films
Remakes of Nepalese films
Films shot in Kathmandu